Yaroslavsky District, Moscow  is an administrative district (raion) of North-Eastern Administrative Okrug, and one of the 125 raions of Moscow, Russia. The district is situated on both sides of a major highway, Yaroslavskoye shosse, east from Yaroslavsky railway, and is named after both. The railway serves as the district's western border, Losiny Ostrov national park is on its eastern border, and MKAD serves as its northern border. The Moscow State University of Civil Engineering is located in this district at 26 Yaroslavsky Highway.

See also
Administrative divisions of Moscow

References

Notes

Sources

Districts of Moscow
North-Eastern Administrative Okrug